A cigar box is a box container for cigar packaging. Traditionally cigar boxes have been made of wood, cardboard or paper.  Spanish cedar has been described as the "best" kind of wood for cigar boxes because of its beautiful grain, fine texture, and pleasant odor and ability to keep out insects.  Eucalyptus and yellow poplar have been popular substitutes that were sometimes stained and scented to resemble it.  Other typical woods for cigar boxes include mahogany, elm, and white oak; less-popular are basswood, Circassian walnut, and rosewood.

There are several types of cigar boxes, differing both in construction and purpose. The following are common boxes:

Cabinet selection, slid-lid or hinged lid, typically storing 25 or 50 cigars
8-9-8, round-sided box with three layers, counting 8, 9 and 8 cigars respectively.
Flat top or 13-topper, two layers with 12 on bottom and 13 on top
Boxes of box-pressed cigars, stored two layers with same number of cigars.

Cigar boxes, labels, and bands are considered a subject of art, with businesses specializing in them and books printed on their design, meaning, and significance. As a result, cigar boxes and their corresponding labels can be considered collectible items.

There is a growing movement of guitars and ukuleles being made from cigar boxes and other materials not usually used for musical instruments.

Media

References

External links
The Canadian Museum of Civilization - Cigar Containers that Store Our Past 1883-1935

Cigars
Containers
Tobacciana

fr:Boîte à cigare
it:Cigar box
ja:シガーボックス
zh:雪茄盒